Henry Holden Halliday (30 March 1855 – 19 July 1922) was a New Zealand cricketer who played first-class cricket for Nelson from 1874 to 1880.

On his first-class debut against Wellington in 1873-74, Harry Halliday opened the batting in the first innings for Nelson and made 35, their highest score of the match. He was less successful with the bat in later matches, but he established himself as one of the best long stops in New Zealand at a time when that was an important fielding position.
 
He died suddenly aged 67 at home in Hokitika in July 1922, leaving a widow, a daughter and three sons.

References

External links
 
 

1855 births
1922 deaths
Nelson cricketers
People from Hokitika
New Zealand cricketers